Petre Poalelungi (born 23 August 1941) was a Romanian former wrestler who competed in the 1972 Summer Olympics.

References

External links
 

1941 births
Living people
Olympic wrestlers of Romania
Wrestlers at the 1972 Summer Olympics
Romanian male sport wrestlers